Netsanet Desta Gebre (born 26 October 2000) is an Ethiopian athlete. She competed in the women's 800m event at the 2020 Summer Olympics.

References

Living people
2000 births
Ethiopian female middle-distance runners
Olympic athletes of Ethiopia
Athletes (track and field) at the 2020 Summer Olympics
21st-century Ethiopian women